Tom David Kahn (September 15, 1938 – March 27, 1992) was an American social democrat known for his leadership in several organizations.  He was an activist and influential strategist in the Civil Rights Movement.  He was a senior adviser and leader in the U.S. labor movement.

Kahn was raised in New York City. At Brooklyn College, he joined the U.S. socialist movement, where he was influenced by Max Shachtman and Michael Harrington. As an assistant to civil rights leader Bayard Rustin, Kahn helped to organize the 1963 March on Washington, during which Martin Luther King Jr. delivered his "I Have a Dream" speech. Kahn's analysis of the civil rights movement influenced Bayard Rustin (who was the nominal author of Kahn's "From Protest to Politics"). It remains widely reprinted, for example in Rustin's Down the Line of 1971  and Time on two crosses of 2003.)

A leader in the Socialist Party of America, Kahn supported its 1972 name change to Social Democrats, USA (SDUSA). Like other leaders of SDUSA, Kahn worked to support free labor-unions and democracy and to oppose Soviet communism; he also worked to strengthen U.S. labor unions. Kahn worked as a senior assistant to and speechwriter for Democratic Senator Henry "Scoop" Jackson, AFL–CIO Presidents George Meany and Lane Kirkland, and other leaders of the Democratic Party, labor unions, and civil-rights organizations.

In 1980 Lane Kirkland appointed Kahn to organize the AFL–CIO's support for the Polish labor-union Solidarity; this support was made despite protests by the USSR and the Carter administration. He acted as the Director of the AFL–CIO Department of International Affairs in 1986 and was officially named Director in 1989. Kahn died in 1992, at the age of 53.

Biography

Early life
Kahn was born Thomas John Marcel on September 15, 1938, and was immediately placed for adoption at the New York Foundling Hospital. He was adopted by the Jewish couple Adele and David Kahn, and renamed Thomas David Kahn. His father, a member of the Communist Party USA, became President of the Transport Workers Local 101 of the Brooklyn Union Gas Company.

Tom Kahn was a civil libertarian who "ran for president of the Student Organization of Erasmus Hall High School in 1955 on a platform calling for the destruction of the student assembly, because it had no power", an election he lost. In high school, he met Rachelle Horowitz, who would become his lifelong friend and political ally.

Democratic socialism
At Brooklyn College (CUNY),  the undergraduate students Kahn and Horowitz joined  the U.S. movement for democratic socialism after hearing Max Shachtman denounce the 1956 Soviet invasion of Hungary: Shachtman described

As young socialists, Kahn's and Horowitz's  talents were recognized by Michael Harrington. Harrington had joined Shachtman after working with Dorothy Day's Catholic Worker's house of hospitality in the Bowery of Lower Manhattan. Harrington was about to become famous in the United States for his book on poverty in the United States, The Other America. Kahn idolized Harrington, particularly for his erudition and rhetoric, both in writing and in debate.

Civil rights

As a leader of the American socialist movement, Michael Harrington sent Tom Kahn and Rachelle Horowitz to help Bayard Rustin, one of the leaders of the Civil Rights Movement, who became a mentor to Kahn. Kahn and Horowitz were affectionately called the "Bayard Rustin Marching and Chowder Society" by Harrington.
Kahn helped Rustin organize the 1957 Prayer Pilgrimage to Washington and the 1958 and 1959 Youth March for Integrated Schools.

Homosexuality and Bayard Rustin
As a young man, Tom Kahn "was gay but wanted to be straight ... It was a different world then", according to Rachelle Horowitz. He had a short relationship with a member of the Young People's Socialist League (YPSL):

Although everyone active in the movement was aware of it, [before 1956] he was never explicitly out of the closet. He took his sexual orientation as an affliction, a source of pain and embarrassment. In part, perhaps, because he was so unreconciled to his longings, he limited himself for a long time to brief encounters. But then he became involved with one of the YPSL's and was compelled to seek the counsel of a psychiatrist to explain his unfamiliar feelings. The diagnosis, he told me, was "you're in love."

Tom Kahn was "very good looking, a very attractive guy" according to longtime socialist David McReynolds, who was also an openly gay New Yorker. Kahn accepted his homosexuality in 1956, the year that Kahn and Horowitz volunteered to help Bayard Rustin with his work in the civil-rights movement. "Once he met Bayard [Rustin], then Kahn knew that he was gay and had this long-term relationship with Bayard, which went through many stages", according to Horowitz, who quoted Kahn's remembrance of Rustin:

When I met him for the first time he was a few years younger than I am now, and I was barely on the edge of manhood. He drew me into a vortex of his endless campaigns and projects ... He introduced me to Bach and Brahms, and to the importance of maintaining a balance in life between the pursuit of our individual pleasures and engagements in, and responsibility for, the social condition. He believed that no class, caste or genre of people were exempt from this obligation.

However, cohabiting in Rustin's apartment proved unsuccessful, and their romantic relationship ended when Kahn enrolled in the historically black Howard University. Kahn and Rustin remained lifelong friends and political comrades.

Howard University
Kahn, a white student, enrolled for his junior and senior years at Howard University, where he became a leader in student politics. Kahn worked closely with Stokely Carmichael, who later became a national leader of young civil-rights activists and then one of the leaders of the Black Power movement. Kahn and Carmichael helped to fund a five-day run of Three Penny Opera, by the Marxist playwright Berthold Brecht and the socialist composer Kurt Weill: "Tom Kahn—very shrewdly—had captured the position of Treasurer of the Liberal Arts Student Council and the infinitely charismatic and popular Carmichael as floor whip was good at lining up the votes. Before they knew what hit them the Student Council had become a patron of the arts, having voted to buy out the remaining performances." Kahn and Carmichael worked with Howard University's chapter of Student Nonviolent Coordinating Committee (SNCC). Kahn introduced Carmichael and his fellow SNCC activists to Bayard Rustin, who became an influential adviser to SNCC. Kahn and Rustin's emphasis on economic inequality influenced Carmichael. Kahn graduated from Howard in 1961.

Leadership
Kahn (along with Horowitz and Norman Hill) helped Rustin and A. Philip Randolph to plan the 1963 March on Washington, at which Martin Luther King Jr. delivered his "I Have a Dream" speech. For this march, Kahn also ghost wrote the speech of A. Philip Randolph, the senior leader of the civil-rights movement and the African-American labor movement. Kahn's analysis of the civil-rights movement influenced Bayard Rustin (who was the nominal author of Kahn's 1964–1965 essay "From protest to politics"), Stokely Carmichael,  and William Julius Wilson.

League for Industrial Democracy
Kahn was Director of the League for Industrial Democracy after 1964. Beginning in 1960, he wrote several LID pamphlets, many of which were published in political journals like Dissent and Commentary, and some of which appeared in anthologies. Kahn's  The Economics of Equality LID pamphlet gave an "incisive radical analysis of what it would take to end racial oppression".

Student League for Industrial Democracy: Students for a Democratic Society (SDS)
Before Kahn became LID director in 1964, he was involved with the Student League for Industrial Democracy, which became Students for a Democratic Society (SDS). Along with other LID members Rachelle Horowitz, Michael Harrington, and Don Slaiman, Kahn attended the LID-sponsored meeting that discussed the Port Huron Statement. Kahn was listed as a student representative from Howard University and was elected to the National Executive Committee. The LID representatives criticized the Port Huron Statement for promoting students as leaders of social change, for criticizing the U.S. labor movement and its unions, and for its criticisms of liberal and socialist opposition to Soviet communism ("anti-communism"). Kahn believed that the SDS students were "elitist", being overly critical of labor unions and liberals, and attributed upper-class origins and Ivy-league schooling to them, according to Port-Huron activist Todd Gitlin, who observes that Kahn was the son of a "manual laborer".

LID and SDS split in 1965, when SDS voted to remove from its constitution the "exclusion clause" that prohibited membership by communists, against Kahn's arguments. The SDS exclusion clause had barred "advocates of or apologists for" "totalitarianism". The clause's removal effectively invited "disciplined cadre" to attempt to "take over or paralyze" SDS, as had occurred to mass organizations in the thirties. Afterward, Marxism Leninism, particularly the Progressive Labor Party, helped to write "the death sentence" for SDS. Nonetheless Kahn continued to argue with SDS leaders about the need for accountable leadership, about tactics, and about strategy. In 1966, Kahn attended the Illinois Convention of SDS, where his forceful arguments and delivery overwhelmed and were resented by  the other activists; Kahn was then 28 years old.

Kahn's determined style of debate emerged from the socialist movement led by Max Shachtman.  Kahn expressed his admiration for Shachtman's intellectual toughness in his 1973 memorial:

"His answers, of course, could not always be correct. But they were on target and always fundamental."

Social Democrats, USA

Kahn and Horowitz were leaders in the Socialist Party USA, and supported its change of name to Social Democrats, USA (SDUSA), despite Harrington's opposition.
Ben Wattenberg commented that SDUSA members seemed to be

Kahn worked as a senior assistant and speechwriter for Senator Henry "Scoop" Jackson, AFL–CIO Presidents George Meany and Lane Kirkland, and other leaders of the Democratic Party, labor unions, and civil rights organizations. He was an effective speechwriter because he was able to express ideas to an American audience, according to Wattenberg.

Estrangement with Harrington
Another protégé of Shachtman's, Michael Harrington, called for an immediate withdrawal of U.S. forces from Vietnam in 1972. His proposal was rejected by the majority, who criticized the war's conduct and called for a negotiated peace treaty, the position associated with Shachtman and Kahn. Harrington resigned his honorary chairmanship of the Socialist Party and organized a caucus for like-minded socialists.
The conflict between Kahn and Harrington became "pretty bad", according to Irving Howe.

Harrington handed former SDS activist and New York City journalist Jack Newfield a speech by AFL–CIO President George Meany. Addressing the September 1972 Convention of the United Steelworkers of America, Meany ridiculed the Democratic Party Convention, which had been held in Miami:

We heard from the gay-lib [gay-liberation] people who want to legalize marriage between boys and boys, and between girls and girls ... We heard from the people who looked like Jacks, acted like Jills, and had the odor of Johns [customers of prostitutes] about them.

This gay-baiting taunt was attributed to Kahn by Harrington, and repeated by Newfield in his autobiography.  Maurice Isserman's biography of Harrington also described this speech as Kahn's self hatred, as "Kahn's resort to gay bashing".

The blaming of Kahn for Meany's speech and Isserman's scholarship have been criticized by Rachelle Horowitz, Kahn's friend, and by Joshua Muravchik, then an officer of the Young People's Socialist League (1907). According to Horowitz, Meany had many speechwriters—two specialists besides Kahn and even more writers from the AFL–CIO's Committee on Political Education (COPE) Department. Horowitz stated, "It is in fact inconceivable that Kahn wrote those words." She quoted a concurring assessment from Arch Puddington: [Isserman] "assumes that because Kahn was not publicly gay he had to be a gay basher. He never was." According to Muravchik, "there is no reason to believe that Kahn wrote those lines, and Isserman presents none."

Harrington failed to support an anti-discrimination (gay rights) plank in the 1978 platform of the Democratic Party Convention, but noted his personal support after being criticized in The Nation. Along with others in the AFL–CIO and SDUSA, Kahn was accused of criticizing  Harrington's application for his Democratic Socialist Organizing Committee to join the Socialist International and to organize a  1983 conference on European socialism; Harrington complained for six pages in his autobiography The Long Distance Runner, and "brooded" about Kahn's opposition, exaggerating the importance of the Socialist International to America, according to Isserman's biography. In 1991, even after Harrington's 1989 death, Howe warned Harrington's biographer, Maurice Isserman, that Kahn's description of Harrington "may well be a little nasty" and "hard line".

AFL–CIO support for free trade-unions

After becoming an assistant to the President of the AFL–CIO in 1972, a position he held until 1986, Kahn developed an expertise in international affairs. In 1980 AFL–CIO officer Lane Kirkland appointed Kahn to organize the AFL–CIO support for the Polish labor-union Solidarity, which was maintained and indeed increased even after protests by the USSR and Carter administration.

Support of Solidarity, the Polish union

Kahn was heavily involved in supporting the Polish labor-movement. The trade union Solidarity (Solidarność) began in 1980. The Soviet-backed Communist regime headed by General Wojciech Jaruzelski declared martial law in December 1981.

In 1980 AFL–CIO President Lane Kirkland appointed Kahn to organize the AFL–CIO's support of Solidarity. The AFL–CIO sought approval in advance from Solidarity's leadership, to avoid jeopardizing their position with unwanted or surprising American help. Politically, the AFL–CIO supported the twenty-one demands of the Gdansk workers, by lobbying to stop further U.S. loans to Poland unless those demands were met. Materially, the AFL–CIO established the Polish Workers Aid Fund. By 1981 it had raised almost $300,000, which was used to purchase printing presses and office supplies. The AFL–CIO donated typewriters, duplicating machines, a minibus, an offset press, and other supplies requested by Solidarity.

In testimony to the Joint Congressional Commission on Security and Cooperation in Europe, Kahn suggested policies to support the Polish people, in particular by supporting Solidarity's demand that the Communist regime finally establish legality, by respecting the twenty-one rights guaranteed by the Polish constitution.

The AFL–CIO's support enraged the Communist regimes of Eastern Europe and the Soviet Union, and worried the Carter Administration, whose Secretary of State Edmund Muskie told Kirkland that the AFL–CIO's continued support of Solidarity could trigger a Soviet invasion of Poland. After Kirkland refused to withdraw support to Solidarity, Muskie met with the USSR's Ambassador, Anatoly Dobyrnin, to clarify that the AFL–CIO's aid did not have the support of the U.S. government.  Aid to Solidarity was also initially opposed by neo-conservatives Norman Podhoretz and Jeane Kirkpatrick, who before 1982 argued that communism could not be overthrown and that Solidarity was doomed.

The AFL–CIO's autonomous support of Solidarity was so successful that by 1984 both Democrats and Republicans agreed that it deserved public support. The AFL–CIO's example of open support was deemed to be appropriate for a democracy, and much more suitable than the clandestine funding through the CIA that had occurred before 1970. Both parties and President Ronald Reagan supported a non-governmental organization, National Endowment for Democracy (NED), through which Congress would openly fund Solidarity through an allocation in the State Department's budget, beginning in 1984. The NED was designed with four core institutions, associated with the two major parties and with the AFL-CIO and the U.S. Chamber of Commerce (representing business). The NED's first president was Carl Gershman, a former Director of Social Democrats, USA and former U.S. Representative to the United Nations committee on human rights. From 1984 until 1990, the NED and the AFL–CIO channeled equipment and support worth $4 million to Solidarity.

Director of the AFL–CIO's Department of International Affairs
In 1986 Kahn became the Director of the AFL–CIO Department of International Affairs, where he implemented Kirkland's program of having a consensus foreign policy. Working with leaders from member unions, Kahn helped to draft resolutions that represented consensus decisions for nearly all issues.

Kahn acted as Director of the AFL–CIO Department of International Affairs in 1986, after Irving Brown suffered a stroke and resigned that same year; after Brown's death in 1989, Kahn was officially named the Director.

Living with AIDS
Earlier in 1986, Kahn had learned that he was infected with human immunodeficiency virus (HIV), "which was then a death sentence". Kahn longed to spend his remaining years with his "new and most beloved partner", who was "the love of his life". However, he accepted the office of Director out of a feeling of duty, knowing that he was taking "a job that would most surely work him to death". He warned his co-workers that his terminal condition would bring intellectual degeneration, and asked that they monitor him for signs of debilitation. An upgrade of the International Department's computer systems was to have allowed Kahn to work from home.

Kahn died from acquired immunodeficiency syndrome  (AIDS) in Silver Spring, Maryland on March 27, 1992, at the age of 53, after having been cared for by his partner and supported by his friends and colleagues. He was survived by his partner and also his sister and his niece. Kahn planned most of his own memorial service, which was held in the AFL–CIO headquarters.

Works

 "The Power of the March — And After," Dissent, vol. 10, no. 4 (Autumn 1963), pp. 316–320.
 "Problems of the Negro Movement," Dissent, vol. 11, no. 1 (Winter 1964), pp. 108–138.
 The Economics of Equality. Foreword by A. Philip Randolph and Michael Harrington. New York: League for Industrial Democracy, 1964.
 From Protest to Politics: The Future of the Civil Rights Movement. New York: League for Industrial Democracy, Feb. 1965. —Ghost written by Kahn, according to Horowitz (2007), pp. 223–224.
 "Problems of the Negro Movement," in Irving Howe (ed.), The Radical Papers. Garden City, NY: Doubleday and Co., 1966; pp. 144–169.
 "Direct Action and Democratic Values," Dissent, vol. 13, no. 1, whole no. 50 (Jan.-Feb. 1966), pp. 22–30.
 "The Riots and the Radicals," Dissent, vol. 14, no. 5, whole no. 60 (Sept.-Oct. 1967), pp. 517–526.
 "The Problem of the New Left," Commentary, vol. 42 (July 1966), pp. 30–38.
  "Max Shachtman: His Ideas and His Movement,"  New America, Nov. 15, 1972.
 "Farewell to a Decade of Illusions," New America, vol. 11 (Dec. 1980), pp. 6–9.
 "How to Support Solidarnosc: A Debate." With Norman Podhoretz; introduction by Midge Decter; moderated by Carl Gershman. Democratiya, vol. 13 (Summer 2008), pp. 230–261.
 "Moral Duty," Transaction, vol. 19, no. 3 (March 1982), pg. 51.
 "Beyond the Double Standard: A Social Democratic View of the Authoritarianism versus Totalitarianism Debate," New America, July 1985. —Speech of January 1985.

Notes

References
 
 
 
 
  Republished as Lost prophet: The life and times of Bayard Rustin (Chicago: The University of Chicago Press, 2004). 
   Revised and incorporated in

Further reading

External links

Photographs
   Picture of Tom Kahn—with Rachelle Horowitz, James Farmer (CORE leader), and Ernest Green—at 1964 World's Fair, protesting poverty, before their arrest. in 
 Tom Kahn with Donald Slaiman of Social Democrats, USA.

AFL–CIO people
American trade union leaders
Workers' rights activists
American social democrats
American democratic socialists
Activists for African-American civil rights
American democracy activists
Members of Social Democrats USA
Members of the Socialist Party of America
American political activists
American social activists
American speechwriters
American political writers
American male non-fiction writers
American social sciences writers
Ghostwriters
Howard University alumni
Brooklyn College alumni
Erasmus Hall High School alumni
AIDS-related deaths in Maryland
American gay writers
LGBT people from New York (state)
American adoptees
1938 births
1992 deaths
20th-century American biographers
20th-century LGBT people